Adductor may refer to:
 Adductor muscle (disambiguation)
 Adductor canal

See also 

 Adduction, a motion that pulls towards the midline of the body or limb